Lindholmsdockan is a dry dock and is located in Gothenburg, Sweden.  It opened in 1875 and is being used as a small marina.

Shipyards of Sweden
Drydocks
Buildings and structures in Gothenburg